Telipna albofasciata is a butterfly in the family Lycaenidae. It is found in Nigeria, Cameroon, Equatorial Guinea, the Republic of the Congo, Gabon, Angola, the Central African Republic, the Democratic Republic of the Congo and Sudan.

Subspecies
Telipna albofasciata albofasciata (south-eastern Nigeria, Cameroon, Equatorial Guinea, Congo, Gabon, Angola, Central African Republic, western Democratic Republic of the Congo)
Telipna albofasciata laplumei Devos, 1917 (northern Democratic Republic of the Congo, southern Sudan)

References

Butterflies described in 1910
Poritiinae
Taxa named by Per Olof Christopher Aurivillius